Pingree School is a coeducational, independent secondary day school located in South Hamilton, Massachusetts, serving the area north and east of Boston. Its students commute from 50 cities and towns, from as far south as Everett, as far north as Hampton and as far west as the Merrimack Valley.

History of Pingree School 
In 1961, the Pingree school, located in South Hamilton, Massachusetts, was founded by Sumner and Mary Pingree in the mansion in which they raised their three sons. Pingree opened as a girls-only school, and in 1971 the school became coeducational. Since then, Pingree has grown to be a coeducational school with an enrollment of around 350.

Construction and additions
Four capital drives have allowed the addition of the library (1966); a science wing and cafeteria (1969); the Weld Field House, a modern kitchen, locker rooms, and two classrooms (1977); and tennis courts and parking areas (1982). In the spring of 1987, the Mary Weld Center for the Performing Arts, which houses a 425-seat theatre, art rooms, music rooms and additional classrooms, was completed. The H. Alden Johnson Rink was finished in time for the 1988–1989 hockey season. In the summer of 2000, construction was completed on a major addition to the library, additional classrooms, the dining commons and student areas. In 2001, plans were drawn up and construction was started on the new academic center which was finished in time for the 2004–2005 school year.

The academic center contains a new senior locker area, three floors of new classrooms (the first floor replaces the old science wing), and academic support centers alongside new faculty departmental offices. English, History, Math, and Science are taught in the new academic center, while languages (French, Spanish, and Mandarin) are taught in the old house. An addition to the H. Alden Johnson Rink was completed in time for the 2006-2007 hockey season. The newly renovated rink now consists of a fitness center to be used by students as well as faculty, and four new locker rooms with showers.

The Pingree football team won the Clark Francis Bowl in 2009 as well as the Norm Walker Bowl in 2010.

See also
 Eastern Independent League
 List of high schools in Massachusetts

1961 establishments in Massachusetts
Educational institutions established in 1961
Private high schools in Massachusetts
Buildings and structures in Hamilton, Massachusetts
Schools in Essex County, Massachusetts